The Green Mountain Cog Railway was a mountain railway built to carry tourists to the top of Green Mountain (now known as Cadillac Mountain) on Mount Desert Island in Maine.

History 

At the end of the 19th century, Maine's tourist industry was developing rapidly. The islands off the coast of Maine were popular attractions, and the possibility of a cog railway to the top of Green Mountain was first explored in the late 1870s, following the success of the Mount Washington Cog Railway in New Hampshire. Construction of the railway started in 1883, and it was built to the designs in the Marsh patents developed for the Mount Washington line. The first locomotive was built by the Manchester Locomotive Works, and was meant to be for the Mount Washington line. After the first season, Frank Clergue, "owner and operator", bought another coach and locomotive, both identical to their predecessors. The coaches and work cars were built by the Hinckley & Egery Iron Co. The coaches had eight benches, with open air seating that could hold six. During bad weather, canvas tarps were rolled down from the ceiling to protect the passengers from the wind and rain. The #1 locomotive was named "Mount Desert", and #2 was not named. Both locomotives were used at the same time when there were large numbers of passengers. There were no switches on the railway, so the trains did not have the ability to pass each other.

The line operated during the summer season and for the first few years was successful. But tourist numbers declined, and after the 1890 season the railway ceased operations. The railway's two steam locomotives were sold to the Mount Washington Cog Railway in 1895 after five years of disuse.

Locomotives

See also 
 Chicago Tunnel Company
 Manitou and Pike's Peak Railway
 Mount Washington Cog Railway
 Quincy and Torch Lake Cog Railway

References 

 

Mountain railways
Defunct Maine railroads
4 ft 8 in gauge railways in the United States
Narrow gauge railroads in Maine